The 2013 Major League Soccer All-Star Game, held on July 31, 2013, was the 18th annual Major League Soccer All-Star Game, a soccer match involving all-stars from Major League Soccer. The game was played at Sporting Park, now known as Children's Mercy Park, in Kansas City, Kansas.

The game featured the MLS All-Stars against Roma from Italy's Serie A, marking the first time that an Italian team has played in the MLS All-Star Game. Roma is also the first European club not from Great Britain to play in the All-Star Game.

Peter Vermes, the coach of Sporting Kansas City (the All-Star Game's host), was announced to coach the MLS All-Stars. A unique feature of this year's MLS All-Star Game was that the 11th player in the fan XI was decided through the FIFA 13 video game, with players from around the world scoring goals with their player of choice, and the player with the most goals scored at the end of the allotted time frame would earn their place. Italian Montreal Impact striker Marco Di Vaio made the cut, joining the ten other fan XI players and those voted for by other MLS players and those chosen by Peter Vermes and MLS Commissioner Don Garber. Despite initially being selected, Robbie Keane and Tim Cahill, of LA Galaxy and New York Red Bulls, were both removed from the squad due to injury, which led to their being replaced by Landon Donovan and Jack McInerney, playing for LA Galaxy and Philadelphia Union.

A.S. Roma won the game 3–1, with goals from Kevin Strootman, Alessandro Florenzi, and Junior Tallo.

Roster

MLS All-Stars
As of July 28, 2013

•- Fan XI *- 11th Player of Fan XI, determined through FIFA 13

♦ - Players selected by MLS Commissioner Don Garber and All-Star Coach Peter Vermes♥ - "Inactive Roster" players voted for by other players in MLS#- Injured Player that was replaced% - Chosen by Don Garber and Peter Vermes to replace the injured Robbie Keane and Tim Cahill

Roma squad

''As of July 25, 2013

Match

Details

References

2013
Soccer in Kansas
All-Star Game
MLS All-Star
A.S. Roma matches
July 2013 sports events in the United States
Sports competitions in Kansas
Sports in the Kansas City metropolitan area